Musa Khaled Ismail Al-Zubi (born 11 February 1993) is a Jordanian professional footballer who plays as a left-back for Jordanian club Al-Salt.

Career statistics

International

References

External links
 

Living people
Jordanian footballers
Jordan international footballers
1993 births
Al-Ahli SC (Amman) players
Shabab Al-Ordon Club players
Al-Ramtha SC players
Association football defenders
Al-Salt SC players
Jordanian Pro League players